The Leys in Barnet Lane, Elstree, Hertfordshire, is an architecturally notable house that is grade II* listed with Historic England.

References 

Grade II* listed buildings in Hertfordshire
Houses in Hertfordshire
Art Nouveau architecture in England